The 2015–16 Hong Kong Reserve Division League was the 58th season since the establishment of the Hong Kong Reserve Division League.

League table

Results

See also
 2015–16 Hong Kong Premier League
 2015–16 in Hong Kong football

References

2015–16 in Hong Kong football leagues
Hong Kong Reserve Division League